Costilla County (Spanish for "rib") is a county located in the U.S. state of Colorado. As of the 2020 census, the population was 3,499. The county seat is San Luis, the oldest continuously occupied town in Colorado.

History

On July 8, 1694, Spanish Conquistador Don Diego de Vargas and his army, two weeks before the Battle of Astialakwa, reached Costilla County. Diego Vargas is not the first Spaniard in Colorado. Juan de Archuleta led an expedition into Colorado in 1664 - but his expedition is the first traceable Spanish expedition into Colorado. In 1647, Governor Luis Rosas fought with the Utes in northern New Mexico. While Rosa came near Colorado, it has not been verified he actually did.

Costilla County was the first area of Colorado to be settled by European-Americans. The county made up the major part of the Sangre de Cristo Land Grant awarded by the government of New Mexico to the Carlos Beaubien family in 1843. Hispanic settlers from Taos, New Mexico, officially established San Luis on April 9, 1851. Costilla County was one of the original 17 counties created by the Territory of Colorado on November 1, 1861. The county was named for Costilla Creek. San Miguel was originally designated the county seat, but the county government was moved to San Luis in 1863. (In 1869, surveys placed San Miguel in the New Mexico Territory.)

The county's original boundaries extended over much of south-central Colorado. Much of the northern portion became part of Saguache County in 1866, and the western portions were folded into Hinsdale and Rio Grande counties in 1874. Costilla County arrived at its modern boundaries in 1913 when Alamosa County was created from its northwest portions.

Geography

Adjacent counties
 Huerfano County - northeast
 Las Animas County - east
 Colfax County, New Mexico - southeast
 Taos County, New Mexico - south
 Conejos County - west
 Alamosa County - northwest

Major Highways
  U.S. Highway 160
  State Highway 142
  State Highway 159

National protected area
 San Isabel National Forest

Historic trails and sites
 Fort Garland State History Museum
 Los Caminos Antiguos Scenic and Historic Byway
 Old Spanish National Historic Trail

Demographics

As of the census of 2000, there were 3,663 people, 1,503 households, and 1,029 families living in the county. The racial makeup of the county was 60.91% White, 0.79% Black or African American, 2.48% Native American, 1.01% Asian, 0.14% Pacific Islander, 29.46% from other races, and 5.21% from two or more races. 67.59% of the population were Hispanic or Latino of any race.

There were 1,503 households, out of which 28.50% had children under the age of 18 living with them, 52.60% were married couples living together, 11.30% had a female householder with no husband present, and 31.50% were non-families. 28.10% of all households were made up of individuals, and 11.60% had someone living alone who was 65 years of age or older. The average household size was 2.44 and the average family size was 2.98.

In the county, the population was spread out, with 25.00% under the age of 18, 6.60% from 18 to 24, 23.30% from 25 to 44, 28.30% from 45 to 64, and 16.80% who were 65 years of age or older. The median age was 42 years. For every 100 females there were 99.80 males. For every 100 females age 18 and over, there were 96.20 males.

The median income for a household in the county was $19,531, and the median income for a family was $25,509, the lowest for Colorado. Males had a median income of $22,390 versus $16,121 for females. The per capita income for the county was $10,748. About 21.30% of families and 26.80% of the population were below the poverty line, including 32.40% of those under age 18 and 23.30% of those age 65 or over.

Politics
Costilla County tends to favor the Democratic candidate in Presidential elections. The last Republican to carry the county was Calvin Coolidge in 1924, and the last to gain an absolute majority William Howard Taft in 1912 – an era when most votes in these high valley counties were done for the voters by political machines. In the last eleven Presidential elections the Democratic candidate has consistently received over sixty percent of the county's vote and four times won over seventy percent.

In Colorado's first elections as a state in 1876, Auguste Lacome (D) ran against William H. Meyer (R) for State Senate in Costilla County, then Colorado's 18th District. Meyer would later become the Lt. Governor of Colorado. Votes cast for “Locome” and “Lacompte” were included in the count for Lacome. Meyer carried the election 349–204.

It is part of Colorado's 3rd congressional district, which has a Cook Partisan Voting Index of R+5 and is represented by Republican Lauren Boebert. In the Colorado Senate it is in District 35 and is represented by Cleave Simpson. In the Colorado House of Representatives it is in District 62 and is represented by Democrat Donald Valdez.

Communities

Towns
 Blanca
 San Luis

Census-designated places
 Fort Garland
 San Acacio

Other unincorporated places
 Chama
 Garcia
 Jaroso
 Mesita
 Russell

See also

 Outline of Colorado
 Index of Colorado-related articles
 National Register of Historic Places listings in Costilla County, Colorado
 Auguste Lacome

References

External links
 
 Colorado County Evolution by Don Stanwyck
 Colorado Historical Society
 San Luis Valley Information Center

 
Colorado counties
1861 establishments in Colorado Territory
San Luis Valley of Colorado
Populated places established in 1861
Hispanic and Latino American culture in Colorado